Iribarren is a Basque surname, and may refer to:

Gabriel Iribarren (born 1981), Argentine football player 
Gonzalo Pérez Iribarren (1936–1998), Uruguayan mathematician and statistical expert
Hernán Iribarren (born 1984), baseball player
Jean-Michel Iribarren (born 1958), French author
José María Iribarren (1906–1971), Spanish lawyer and writer
Juan Antonio Iribarren (1885–1977), Chilean politician
Juan Francés de Iribarren (1699-1767), Spanish composer
Ramón Iribarren Cavanilles (1900-1967), Spanish civil engineer
Ricardo Iribarren (born 1967), Argentine soccer player

Basque-language surnames